Vodni stolp (Slovene for "water tower") may refer to:

Celje Water Tower
Maribor Water Tower